The "National Museum of Sculpture" is a museum in Valladolid, Spain, belonging to the Spanish Ministry of Culture. The museum has an extensive sculptural collection ranging from the Middle Ages to the 19th century. The collections come mostly from churches and monasteries in the Region of Castile, whose pieces of religious art were confiscated by the State in 1836, by order of Minister of Finance Mendizábal. Other parts of the collections come from particular donations, deposits or acquisitions by the State.

The museum was founded as the Provincial Museum of Fine Arts on 4 October 1842. It had its first headquarters at the Palacio de Santa Cruz. On 29 April 1933 it was moved to the Colegio de San Gregorio. Other current seats are in the 16th-century Palacio de Villena and Palacio del Conde de Gondomar

The museum houses works from the 13th to 19th centuries, executed mostly in the Central Spain, and also in other regions historically  connected to Spain (Italy, Flanders, Southern America). Artworks include, among the others, a  Raising of the Cross by Francisco del Rincon, I Thirst, and The Way of Calvary Gregorio Fernández, Adoration of the Magi by Alonso Berruguete, Lamentation of Christ by Juan de Juni, Penitent Magdalene by Pedro de Mena or the Holy Sepulchre or passage of the Sleepers Alonso de Rozas.

During the Holy Week in Valladolid the museum gives 104 images (distributed in the corresponding pasos) to the processions for the brotherhoods.

Gallery of paintings

Gallery of sculptures

Medieval sculptures

15th century

Renaissance 

Juan de Juni

Baroque 

Gregorio Fernández

See also 
 Colegio de San Gregorio
 Museo de Escultura al Aire Libre de Alcalá de Henares

References

External links
 
Museo Nacional de Escultura within Google Arts & Culture

Museums in Valladolid
Sculpture Valladolid
Art museums established in 1842
1842 establishments in Spain
Museums in Castile and León
Sculpture galleries in Spain
Plaster cast collections
Bien de Interés Cultural landmarks in the Province of Valladolid
Herrerian architecture